Leccinum boreale is a species of bolete fungus in the family Boletaceae. The bolete was described as new to science in 1966 by mycologists Alexander H. Smith, Harry Delbert Thiers, and Roy Watling.

A motion in legislature proposed to make this the official fungus of Alberta in 2009.

See also
List of Leccinum species
List of North American boletes

References

Fungi described in 1966
Fungi of the United States
boreale
Taxa named by Harry Delbert Thiers
Taxa named by Alexander H. Smith
Fungi without expected TNC conservation status